The discography of American recording artist Bobby Womack consists of 28 studio albums, 3 live albums, 9 compilation albums, and 47 singles.

Albums

Studio albums

Live albums

Compilation albums
1975: Greatest Hits (United Artists) – US No. 142, R&B No. 30
1975: I Can Understand It (United Artists) – same tracks as on Greatest Hits
1986: Check it Out (Stateside) – UK SSL 6013
1993: Midnight Mover – The Bobby Womack Collection (EMI USA)
1998: Red Hot + Rhapsody
1999: Traditions (The Right Stuff/Capitol/EMI)
2003: Lookin' For a Love: The Best of 1968–1976 (Stateside Records)
2004: Fly Me to the Moon/My Prescription on one CD ($tateside/EMI Records)
2004: Understanding/Communication ($tateside/EMI Records)
2004: Womack Live/The Safety Zone ($tateside/EMI Records)
2004: Lookin' For A Love Again/BW Goes CW ($tateside/EMI Records)
2004: Facts of Life/I Don't Know What the World Is Coming To ($tateside/EMI Records)
2013: Everything's Gonna Be Alright: The American Singles 1967-76 (Charly Records)
2014: Icon (Capitol/UMe/Universal)

Singles

As lead artist

As featured artist

Other appearances (non-comprehensive)

References

 
 
Discographies of American artists